Pseudomonas kilonensis is a Gram-negative soil bacterium isolated from agricultural soil in Germany. The type strain is DSM 13647.

References

External links
Type strain of Pseudomonas citronellolis at BacDive -  the Bacterial Diversity Metadatabase

Pseudomonadales
Bacteria described in 2001